A list of the mosses of Britain and Ireland.

List

 Abietinella abietina – fir tamarisk-moss
 Acaulon muticum – rounded pygmy-moss
 Acaulon triquetrum – triangular pygmy-moss
 Aloina aloides – common aloe-moss
 Aloina ambigua – tall aloe-moss
 Aloina brevirostris – short-beaked aloe-moss
 Aloina rigida – rigid aloe-moss
 Amblyodon dealbatus – short-tooth hump-moss
 Amblystegium confervoides – tiny feather-moss
 Amblystegium humile – constricted feather-moss
 Amblystegium radicale – swamp feather-moss
 Amblystegium serpens – creeping feather-moss
 Amblystegium varium – willow feather-moss
 Amphidium lapponicum – Lapland yoke-moss
 Amphidium mougeotii – Mougeot's yoke-moss
 Andreaea alpestris – slender rock-moss
 Andreaea alpina – alpine rock-moss
 Andreaea blyttii – Blytt's rock-moss
 Andreaea frigida – icy rock-moss
 Andreaea megistospora – big-spored rock-moss
 Andreaea mutabilis – changeable rock-moss
 Andreaea nivalis – snow rock-moss
 Andreaea rothii – dusky rock-moss
 Andreaea rupestris – black rock-moss
 Andreaea sinuosa – small-spored rock-moss
 Anoectangium aestivum – summer-moss
 Anomobryum julaceum – slender silver-moss
 Anomodon attenuatus – slender tail-moss
 Anomodon longifolius – long-leaved tail-moss
 Anomodon viticulosus – rambling tail-moss
 Antitrichia curtipendula – pendulous wing-moss
 Aongstroemia longipes – sprig-moss
 Aphanorrhegma patens – spreading earth-moss
 Aplodon wormskjoldii – carrion-moss
 Archidium alternifolium – clay earth-moss
 Arctoa fulvella – Arctic fork-moss
 Atrichum angustatum – lesser smoothcap
 Atrichum crispum – fountain smoothcap
 Atrichum tenellum – slender smoothcap
 Atrichum undulatum – common smoothcap
 Aulacomnium androgynum – bud-headed groove-moss
 Aulacomnium palustre – bog groove-moss
 Aulacomnium turgidum – mountain groove-moss
 Barbula convoluta – lesser bird's-claw beard-moss
 Barbula unguiculata – bird's-claw beard-moss
 Bartramia halleriana – Haller's apple-moss
 Bartramia ithyphylla – straight-leaved apple-moss
 Bartramia pomiformis – common apple-moss
 Bartramia stricta – upright apple-moss
 Blindia acuta – sharp-leaved blindia
 Blindia caespiticia – dwarf blindia
 Brachydontium trichodes – bristle-leaf
 Brachythecium albicans – whitish feather-moss
 Brachythecium appleyardiae – Appleyard's feather-moss
 Brachythecium erythrorrhizon – redfoot feather-moss
 Brachythecium glaciale – snow feather-moss
 Brachythecium glareosum – streaky feather-moss
 Brachythecium mildeanum – sand feather-moss
 Brachythecium plumosum – rusty feather-moss
 Brachythecium populeum – matted feather-moss
 Brachythecium reflexum – reflexed feather-moss
 Brachythecium rivulare – river feather-moss
 Brachythecium rutabulum – rough-stalked feather-moss
 Brachythecium salebrosum – smooth-stalk feather-moss
 Brachythecium starkei – Starke's feather-moss
 Brachythecium trachypodium – Lawers feather-moss
 Brachythecium velutinum – velvet feather-moss
 Breutelia chrysocoma – golden-head moss
 Bryoerythrophyllum caledonicum – Scottish beard-moss
 Bryoerythrophyllum ferruginascens – rufous beard-moss
 Bryoerythrophyllum recurvirostrum – red beard-moss
 Bryum algovicum – drooping thread-moss
 Bryum alpinum – alpine thread-moss
 Bryum archangelicum – archangelic thread-moss
 Bryum arcticum – Arctic thread-moss
 Bryum argenteum – silver-moss
 Bryum bimum – bimous marsh Bryum
 Bryum bornholmense – potato Bryum
 Bryum caespiticium – tufted thread-moss
 Bryum calophyllum – blunt Bryum
 Bryum canariense – canary thread-moss
 Bryum capillare – capillary thread-moss
 Bryum creberrimum – tight-tufted thread-moss
 Bryum cyclophyllum – round-leaved Bryum
 Bryum dichotomum – bicoloured Bryum
 Bryum dixonii – Dixon's thread-moss
 Bryum donianum – Don's thread-moss
 Bryum elegans – blushing Bryum
 Bryum funkii – Funck's thread-moss
 Bryum gemmiferum – small-bud Bryum
 Bryum gemmilucens – yellow-bud Bryum
 Bryum gemmiparum – Welsh thread-moss
 Bryum imbricatum – small-mouthed thread-moss
 Bryum intermedium – many-seasoned thread-moss
 Bryum klinggraeffii – raspberry Bryum
 Bryum knowltonii – Knowlton's thread-moss
 Bryum laevifilum – flabby thread-moss
 Bryum lawersianum – Lawers thread-moss
 Bryum mamillatum – sand thread-moss
 Bryum marratii – Baltic Bryum
 Bryum mildeanum – Milde's thread-moss
 Bryum muehlenbeckii – Muehlenbeck's thread-moss
 Bryum neodamense – long-leaved thread-moss
 Bryum pallens – pale thread-moss
 Bryum pallescens – tall-clustered thread-moss
 Bryum pseudotriquetrum – marsh Bryum
 Bryum radiculosum – wall thread-moss
 Bryum riparium – river thread-moss
 Bryum rubens – crimson-tuber thread-moss
 Bryum ruderale – pea Bryum
 Bryum salinum – saltmarsh thread-moss
 Bryum sauteri – Sauter's thread-moss
 Bryum schleicheri – Schleicher's thread-moss
 Bryum stirtonii – Stirton's thread-moss
 Bryum subapiculatum – lesser potato Bryum
 Bryum tenuisetum – yellow-tuber thread-moss
 Bryum torquescens – twisting thread-moss
 Bryum turbinatum – topshape thread-moss
 Bryum uliginosum – cernuous thread-moss
 Bryum violaceum – pill Bryum
 Bryum warneum – warne's thread-moss
 Bryum weigelii – duval's thread-moss
 Buxbaumia aphylla – brown shield-moss
 Buxbaumia viridis – green shield-moss
 Calliergon cordifolium – heart-leaved spear-moss
 Calliergon giganteum – giant spear-moss
 Calliergonella cuspidata – pointed spear-moss
 Calliergonella lindbergii – lindberg's plait-moss
 Calyptrochaeta apiculata – southern Hookeria
 Campyliadelphus chrysophyllus – golden feather-moss
 Campyliadelphus elodes – fine-leaved marsh feather-moss
 Campylium protensum – dull starry feather-moss
 Campylium stellatum – yellow starry feather-moss
 Campylophyllum calcareum – chalk feather-moss
 Campylophyllum halleri – haller's feather-moss
 Campylopus atrovirens – bristly swan-neck moss
 Campylopus brevipilus – compact swan-neck moss
 Campylopus flexuosus – rusty swan-neck moss
 Campylopus fragilis – brittle swan-neck moss
 Campylopus gracilis – Schwarz's swan-neck moss
 Campylopus introflexus – heath star moss
 Campylopus pilifer – stiff swan-neck moss
 Campylopus pyriformis – dwarf swan-neck moss
 Campylopus schimperi – Schimper's swan-neck moss
 Campylopus setifolius – silky swan-neck moss
 Campylopus shawii – Shaw's swan-neck moss
 Campylopus subporodictyon – rusty bow-moss
 Campylopus subulatus – awl-leaved swan-neck moss
 Campylostelium saxicola – bent-moss
 Catoscopium nigritum – down-looking moss
 Ceratodon conicus – scarce redshank
 Ceratodon purpureus – redshank
 Cheilothela chloropus – rabbit moss
 Cinclidium stygium – lurid cupola-moss
 Cinclidotus fontinaloides – smaller lattice-moss
 Cinclidotus riparius – fountain lattice-moss
 Cirriphyllum cirrosum – tendril feather-moss
 Cirriphyllum crassinervium – beech feather-moss
 Cirriphyllum piliferum – hair-pointed feather-moss
 Climacium dendroides – tree-moss
 Conardia compacta – compact feather-moss
 Conostomum tetragonum – helmet-moss
 Coscinodon cribrosus – sieve-tooth moss
 Cratoneuron curvicaule – bent-stem hook-moss
 Cratoneuron filicinum – fern-leaved hook-moss
 Cryphaea heteromalla – lateral cryphaea
 Ctenidium molluscum – chalk comb-moss
 Ctenidium procerrimum – alpine comb-moss
 Cyclodictyon laetevirens – bright-green cave-moss
 Cynodontium fallax – false dog-tooth
 Cynodontium jenneri – Jenner's dog-tooth
 Cynodontium polycarpon – many-fruited dog-tooth
 Cynodontium strumiferum – strumose dog-tooth
 Cynodontium tenellum – delicate dog-tooth
 Daltonia splachnoides – Irish Daltonia
 Dendrocryphaea lamyana – multi-fruited cryphaea
 Dialytrichia mucronata – pointed lattice-moss
 Dichodontium flavescens – yellowish fork-moss
 Dichodontium palustre – marsh forklet-moss
 Dichodontium pellucidum – transparent fork-moss
 Dicranella cerviculata – red-neck forklet-moss
 Dicranella crispa – curl-leaved forklet-moss
 Dicranella grevilleana – Greville's forklet-moss
 Dicranella heteromalla – silky forklet-moss
 Dicranella rufescens – rufous forklet-moss
 Dicranella schreberiana – Schreber's forklet-moss
 Dicranella staphylina – field forklet-moss
 Dicranella subulata – awl-leaved forklet-moss
 Dicranella varia – variable forklet-moss
 Dicranodontium asperulum – orange bow-moss
 Dicranodontium denudatum – beaked bow-moss
 Dicranodontium uncinatum – curve-leaved bow-moss
 Dicranoweisia cirrata – common pincushion
 Dicranoweisia crispula – mountain pincushion
 Dicranum bergeri – waved fork-moss
 Dicranum bonjeanii – crisped fork-moss
 Dicranum elongatum – dense fork-moss
 Dicranum flagellare – whip fork-moss
 Dicranum flexicaule – bendy fork-moss
 Dicranum fuscescens – dusky fork-moss
 Dicranum leioneuron – fuzzy fork-moss
 Dicranum majus – greater fork-moss
 Dicranum montanum – mountain fork-moss
 Dicranum polysetum – rugose fork-moss
 Dicranum scoparium – broom fork-moss
 Dicranum scottianum – Scott's fork-moss
 Dicranum spurium – rusty fork-moss
 Dicranum tauricum – fragile fork-moss
 Didymodon acutus – pointed beard-moss
 Didymodon australasiae – shady beard-moss
 Didymodon cordatus – cordate beard-moss
 Didymodon fallax – fallacious beard-moss
 Didymodon ferrugineus – rusty beard-moss
 Didymodon glaucus – glaucous beard-moss
 Didymodon icmadophilus – slender beard-moss
 Didymodon insulanus – cylindric beard-moss
 Didymodon luridus – dusky beard-moss
 Didymodon mamillosus – Perthshire beard-moss
 Didymodon maximus – Irish beard-moss
 Didymodon nicholsonii – Nicholson's beard-moss
 Didymodon rigidulus – rigid beard-moss
 Didymodon sinuosus – wavy beard-moss
 Didymodon spadiceus – brown beard-moss
 Didymodon tomaculosus – sausage beard-moss
 Didymodon tophaceus – olive beard-moss
 Didymodon vinealis – soft-tufted beard-moss
 Diphyscium foliosum – nut-moss
 Discelium nudum – flag-moss
 Distichium capillaceum – fine Distichium
 Distichium inclinatum – inclined Distichium
 Ditrichum cornubicum – Cornish path-moss
 Ditrichum flexicaule – bendy ditrichum
 Ditrichum gracile – slender ditrichum
 Ditrichum heteromallum – curve-leaved ditrichum
 Ditrichum lineare – dark ditrichum
 Ditrichum plumbicola – lead-moss
 Ditrichum pusillum – brown ditrichum
 Ditrichum subulatum – awl-leaved ditrichum
 Ditrichum zonatum – alpine ditrichum
 Drepanocladus aduncus – Kneiff's hook-moss
 Drepanocladus polygamus – fertile feather-moss
 Drepanocladus sendtneri – chalk hook-moss
 Encalypta alpina – alpine extinguisher-moss
 Encalypta brevicollis – white-mouthed extinguisher-moss
 Encalypta ciliata – fringed extinguisher-moss
 Encalypta rhaptocarpa – ribbed extinguisher-moss
 Encalypta streptocarpa – spiral extinguisher-moss
 Encalypta vulgaris – common extinguisher-moss
 Entodon concinnus – Montagne's cylinder-moss
 Entosthodon attenuatus – thin cord-moss
 Entosthodon fascicularis – Hasselquist's hyssop
 Entosthodon muhlenbergii – Muhlenberg's cord-moss
 Entosthodon obtusus – blunt cord-moss
 Entosthodon pulchellus – pretty cord-moss
 Ephemerum cohaerens – clustered earth-moss
 Ephemerum minutissimum – minute earth-moss
 Ephemerum recurvifolium – strap-leaved earth-moss
 Ephemerum serratum – serrated earth-moss
 Ephemerum sessile – sessile earth-moss
 Ephemerum stellatum – starry earth-moss
 Epipterygium tozeri – Tozer's thread-moss
 Eucladium verticillatum – whorled tufa-moss
 Eurhynchium meridionale – Portland feather-moss
 Eurhynchium pulchellum – elegant feather-moss
 Eurhynchium striatulum – lesser striated feather-moss
 Eurhynchium striatum – common striated feather-moss
 Fissidens adianthoides – maidenhair pocket-moss
 Fissidens bryoides – lesser pocket-moss
 Fissidens celticus – Welsh pocket-moss
 Fissidens crassipes – fatfoot pocket-moss
 Fissidens curnovii – Curnow's pocket-moss
 Fissidens curvatus – Portuguese pocket-moss
 Fissidens dubius – rock pocket-moss
 Fissidens exiguus – tiny pocket-moss
 Fissidens exilis – slender pocket-moss
 Fissidens gracilifolius – narrow-leaved pocket-moss
 Fissidens incurvus – short-leaved pocket-moss
 Fissidens limbatus – Herzog's pocket-moss
 Fissidens monguillonii – Atlantic pocket-moss
 Fissidens osmundoides – purple-stalked pocket-moss
 Fissidens polyphyllus – many-leaved pocket-moss
 Fissidens pusillus – petty pocket-moss
 Fissidens rivularis – river pocket-moss
 Fissidens rufulus – beck pocket-moss
 Fissidens serrulatus – large Atlantic pocket-moss
 Fissidens taxifolius – common pocket-moss
 Fissidens viridulus – green pocket-moss
 Fontinalis antipyretica – greater water-moss
 Fontinalis squamosa – alpine water-moss
 Funaria hygrometrica – common cord-moss
 Glyphomitrium daviesii – black-tufted moss
 Grimmia anodon – toothless Grimmia
 Grimmia arenaria – sand Grimmia
 Grimmia atrata – copper Grimmia
 Grimmia crinita – hedgehog Grimmia
 Grimmia decipiens – great Grimmia
 Grimmia donniana – Donn's Grimmia
 Grimmia elatior – large Grimmia
 Grimmia elongata – brown Grimmia
 Grimmia funalis – string Grimmia
 Grimmia hartmanii – hartman's Grimmia
 Grimmia incurva – black Grimmia
 Grimmia laevigata – hoary Grimmia
 Grimmia longirostris – north Grimmia
 Grimmia montana – sun Grimmia
 Grimmia orbicularis – round-fruited Grimmia
 Grimmia ovalis – flat-rock Grimmia
 Grimmia pulvinata – grey-cushioned Grimmia
 Grimmia ramondii – spreading-leaved Grimmia
 Grimmia tergestina – dapple-mouthed Grimmia
 Grimmia torquata – twisted Grimmia
 Grimmia trichophylla – hair-pointed Grimmia
 Grimmia ungeri – alpine Grimmia
 Grimmia unicolor – dingy Grimmia
 Gymnostomum aeruginosum – verdigris tufa-moss
 Gymnostomum calcareum – blunt-leaf tufa-moss
 Gymnostomum viridulum – Luisier's tufa-moss
 Gyroweisia reflexa – reflexed beardless-moss
 Gyroweisia tenuis – slender stubble-moss
 Habrodon perpusillus – lesser squirrel-tail moss
 Hamatocaulis vernicosus – varnished hook-moss
 Hedwigia ciliata – fringed hoar-moss
 Hedwigia integrifolia – green hoar-moss
 Hedwigia stellata – starry hoar-moss
 Helodium blandowii – Blandow's tamarisk-moss
 Hennediella heimii – Heim's Pottia
 Hennediella macrophylla – short Pottia
 Hennediella stanfordensis – Stanford screw-moss
 Herzogiella seligeri – Silesian feather-moss
 Herzogiella striatella – Muhlenbeck's feather-moss
 Heterocladium dimorphum – dimorphous tamarisk-moss
 Heterocladium heteropterum – wry-leaved tamarisk-moss
 Heterocladium wulfsbergii – wulfsberg's tamarisk-moss
 Homalia trichomanoides – blunt feather-moss
 Homalothecium lutescens – yellow feather-moss
 Homalothecium sericeum – silky wall feather-moss
 Homomallium incurvatum – incurved feather-moss
 Hookeria lucens – shining Hookeria
 Hygroamblystegium fluviatile – brook-side feather-moss
 Hygroamblystegium tenax – fountain feather-moss
 Hygrohypnum duriusculum – broad-leaved brook-moss
 Hygrohypnum eugyrium – western brook-moss
 Hygrohypnum luridum – drab brook-moss
 Hygrohypnum molle – soft brook-moss
 Hygrohypnum ochraceum – claw brook-moss
 Hygrohypnum polare – polar brook-moss
 Hygrohypnum smithii – Arctic brook-moss
 Hygrohypnum styriacum – snow brook-moss
 Hylocomiastrum pyrenaicum – Oake's wood-moss
 Hylocomiastrum umbratum – shaded wood-moss
 Hylocomium splendens – glittering wood-moss
 Hymenostylium insigne – robust tufa-moss
 Hymenostylium recurvirostrum – hook-beak tufa-moss
 Hyocomium armoricum – flagellate feather-moss
 Hypnum andoi – mamillate plait-moss
 Hypnum bambergeri – golden plait-moss
 Hypnum callichroum – downy plait-moss
 Hypnum cupressiforme – cypress-leaved plait-moss
 Hypnum hamulosum – hook-leaved plait-moss
 Hypnum imponens – pellucid plait-moss
 Hypnum jutlandicum – heath plait-moss
 Hypnum lacunosum – great plait-moss
 Hypnum resupinatum – supine plait-moss
 Hypnum revolutum – revolute plait-moss
 Hypnum uncinulatum – hooked plait-moss
 Hypnum vaucheri – Vaucher's plait-moss
 Isopterygiopsis muelleriana – Mueller's silk-moss
 Isopterygiopsis pulchella – neat silk-moss
 Isothecium alopecuroides – larger mouse-tail moss
 Isothecium holtii – Holt's mouse-tail moss
 Isothecium myosuroides – slender mouse-tail moss
 Kiaeria blyttii – Blytt's fork-moss
 Kiaeria falcata – sickle-leaved fork-moss
 Kiaeria glacialis – snow fork-moss
 Kiaeria starkei – Starke's fork-moss
 Kindbergia praelonga – common feather-moss
 Leptobarbula berica – beric beard-moss
 Leptobryum pyriforme – golden thread-moss
 Leptodictyum riparium – Kneiff's feather-moss
 Leptodon smithii – Prince-of-Wales feather-moss
 Leptodontium flexifolium – bent-leaved beard-moss
 Leptodontium gemmascens – thatch-moss
 Leptophascum leptophyllum – vectis-moss
 Lescuraea saxicola – rock feather-moss
 Leskea polycarpa – many-fruited Leskea
 Leucobryum glaucum – large white-moss
 Leucobryum juniperoideum – smaller white-moss
 Leucodon sciuroides – squirrel-tail moss
 Loeskeobryum brevirostre – short-beaked wood-moss
 Meesia triquetra – three-ranked hump-moss
 Meesia uliginosa – broad-nerved hump-moss
 Microbryum curvicolle – swan-necked earth-moss
 Microbryum floerkeanum – Floerke's phascum
 Microbryum rectum – upright Pottia
 Micromitrium tenerum – millimetre moss
 Mielichhoferia elongata – elongate copper-moss
 Mielichhoferia mielichhoferiana – alpine copper-moss
 Mnium ambiguum – ambiguous thyme-moss
 Mnium hornum – swan's-neck thyme-moss
 Mnium marginatum – bordered thyme-moss
 Mnium spinosum – spinose thyme-moss
 Mnium stellare – starry thyme-moss
 Mnium thomsonii – short-beaked thyme-moss
 Molendoa warburgii – Warburg's moss
 Myrinia pulvinata – flood-moss
 Myurella julacea – small mouse-tail moss
 Myurella tenerrima – dwarf mouse-tail moss
 Myurium hochstetteri – hare-tail moss
 Neckera complanata – flat Neckera
 Neckera crispa – crisped Neckera
 Neckera pennata – feathered Neckera
 Neckera pumila – dwarf Neckera
 Octodiceras fontanum – fountain pocket-moss
 Oedipodium griffithianum – gouty-moss
 Oligotrichum hercynicum – Hercynian haircap
 Oncophorus virens – green spur-moss
 Oncophorus wahlenbergii – wahlenberg's spur-moss
 Oreoweisia bruntonii – Brunton's dog-tooth
 Orthodontium gracile – slender thread-moss
 Orthodontium lineare – cape thread-moss
 Orthothecium intricatum – fine-leaved Leskea
 Orthothecium rufescens – red Leskea
 Orthotrichum affine – wood bristle-moss
 Orthotrichum anomalum – anomalous bristle-moss
 Orthotrichum cupulatum – hooded bristle-moss
 Orthotrichum diaphanum – white-tipped bristle-moss
 Orthotrichum gymnostomum – aspen bristle-moss
 Orthotrichum lyellii – Lyell's bristle-moss
 Orthotrichum obtusifolium – blunt-leaved bristle-moss
 Orthotrichum pallens – pale bristle-moss
 Orthotrichum pulchellum – elegant bristle-moss
 Orthotrichum pumilum – dwarf bristle-moss
 Orthotrichum rivulare – river bristle-moss
 Orthotrichum rupestre – rock bristle-moss
 Orthotrichum speciosum – showy bristle-moss
 Orthotrichum sprucei – Spruce's bristle-moss
 Orthotrichum stramineum – straw bristle-moss
 Orthotrichum striatum – Shaw's bristle-moss
 Orthotrichum tenellum – slender bristle-moss
 Oxyrrhynchium hians – Swartz's feather-moss
 Oxyrrhynchium schleicheri – twist-tip feather-moss
 Oxyrrhynchium speciosum – showy feather-moss
 Paludella squarrosa – tufted fen-moss
 Palustriella commutata – curled hook-moss
 Palustriella decipiens – lesser curled hook-moss
 Palustriella falcata – claw-leaved hook-moss
 Paraleptodontium recurvifolium – drooping-leaved beard-moss
 Paraleucobryum longifolium – long-leaved fork-moss
 Phascum cuspidatum – cuspidate earth-moss
 Philonotis arnellii – Arnell's apple-moss
 Philonotis caespitosa – tufted apple-moss
 Philonotis calcarea – thick-nerved apple-moss
 Philonotis cernua – swan-necked apple-moss
 Philonotis fontana – fountain apple-moss
 Philonotis marchica – bog apple-moss
 Philonotis rigida – rigid apple-moss
 Philonotis seriata – spiral apple-moss
 Philonotis tomentella – woolly apple-moss
 Physcomitrium eurystomum – Norfolk bladder-moss
 Physcomitrium pyriforme – common bladder-moss
 Physcomitrium sphaericum – dwarf bladder-moss
 Pictus scoticus – pict-moss
 Plagiobryum demissum – alpine hump-moss
 Plagiobryum zieri – zierian hump-moss
 Plagiomnium affine – many-fruited thyme-moss
 Plagiomnium cuspidatum – woodsy thyme-moss
 Plagiomnium elatum – tall thyme-moss
 Plagiomnium ellipticum – marsh thyme-moss
 Plagiomnium medium – alpine thyme-moss
 Plagiomnium rostratum – long-beaked thyme-moss
 Plagiomnium undulatum – hart's-tongue thyme-moss
 Plagiopus oederianus – Oeder's apple-moss
 Plagiothecium cavifolium – round silk-moss
 Plagiothecium curvifolium – curved silk-moss
 Plagiothecium denticulatum – dented silk-moss
 Plagiothecium laetum – bright silk-moss
 Plagiothecium latebricola – alder silk-moss
 Plagiothecium nemorale – woodsy silk-moss
 Plagiothecium piliferum – hair silk-moss
 Plagiothecium platyphyllum – alpine silk-moss
 Plagiothecium succulentum – juicy silk-moss
 Plagiothecium undulatum – waved silk-moss
 Platydictya jungermannioides – Spruce's Leskea
 Platygyrium repens – flat-brocade moss
 Platyhypnidium alopecuroides – Portuguese feather-moss
 Platyhypnidium riparioides – long-beaked water feather-moss
 Pleuridium acuminatum – taper-leaved earth-moss
 Pleuridium subulatum – awl-leaved earth-moss
 Pleurochaete squarrosa – side-fruited crisp-moss
 Pleurozium schreberi – red-stemmed feather-moss
 Pogonatum aloides – aloe haircap
 Pogonatum nanum – dwarf haircap
 Pogonatum urnigerum – urn haircap
 Pohlia andalusica – gravel thread-moss
 Pohlia annotina – pale-fruited thread-moss
 Pohlia bulbifera – blunt-bud thread-moss
 Pohlia camptotrachela – crookneck nodding-moss
 Pohlia cruda – opal thread-moss
 Pohlia crudoides – Lapland thread-moss
 Pohlia drummondii – Drummond's thread-moss
 Pohlia elongata – long-fruited thread-moss
 Pohlia filum – fat-bud thread-moss
 Pohlia flexuosa – orange-bud thread-moss
 Pohlia lescuriana – pretty nodding-moss
 Pohlia ludwigii – Ludwig's thread-moss
 Pohlia lutescens – yellow thread-moss
 Pohlia melanodon – pink-fruited thread-moss
 Pohlia nutans – nodding thread-moss
 Pohlia obtusifolia – blunt-leaved thread-moss
 Pohlia proligera – bent-bud thread-moss
 Pohlia scotica – Scottish thread-moss
 Pohlia wahlenbergii – pale glaucous thread-moss
 Polytrichastrum alpinum – alpine haircap
 Polytrichastrum formosum – bank haircap
 Polytrichastrum longisetum – slender haircap
 Polytrichastrum sexangulare – northern haircap
 Polytrichum commune – common haircap
 Polytrichum juniperinum – juniper haircap
 Polytrichum piliferum – bristly haircap
 Polytrichum strictum – strict haircap
 Pottia davalliana – smallest Pottia
 Pottia starkeana – Starke's Pottia
 Pottiopsis caespitosa – round-fruited Pottia
 Protobryum bryoides – tall Pottia
 Pseudephemerum nitidum – delicate earth-moss
 Pseudobryum cinclidioides – river thyme-moss
 Pseudocalliergon lycopodioides – large hook-moss
 Pseudocalliergon trifarium – three-ranked spear-moss
 Pseudocalliergon turgescens – turgid scorpion-moss
 Pseudocrossidium hornschuchianum – Hornschuch's beard-moss
 Pseudocrossidium revolutum – revolute beard-moss
 Pseudoleskea incurvata – brown mountain Leskea
 Pseudoleskea patens – patent Leskea
 Pseudoleskeella catenulata – chained Leskea
 Pseudoleskeella nervosa – nerved Leskea
 Pseudoleskeella rupestris – wispy Leskea
 Pseudoscleropodium purum – neat feather-moss
 Pseudotaxiphyllum elegans – elegant silk-moss
 Pterigynandrum filiforme – capillary wing-moss
 Pterogonium gracile – bird's-foot wing-moss
 Pterygoneurum lamellatum – spiral chalk-moss
 Pterygoneurum ovatum – oval-leaved Pottia
 Ptilium crista-castrensis – ostrich-plume feather-moss
 Ptychodium plicatum – plaited Leskea
 Ptychomitrium polyphyllum – long-shanked pincushion
 Pylaisia polyantha – many-flowered Leskea
 Racomitrium aciculare – yellow fringe-moss
 Racomitrium affine – lesser fringe-moss
 Racomitrium aquaticum – narrow-leaved fringe-moss
 Racomitrium canescens – hoary fringe-moss
 Racomitrium ellipticum – oval-fruited fringe-moss
 Racomitrium elongatum – long fringe-moss
 Racomitrium ericoides – dense fringe-moss
 Racomitrium fasciculare – green mountain fringe-moss
 Racomitrium heterostichum – bristly fringe-moss
 Racomitrium himalayanum – Himalayan fringe-moss
 Racomitrium lanuginosum – woolly fringe-moss
 Racomitrium macounii – Macoun's fringe-moss
 Racomitrium sudeticum – slender fringe-moss
 Rhabdoweisia crenulata – greater streak-moss
 Rhabdoweisia crispata – toothed streak-moss
 Rhabdoweisia fugax – dwarf streak-moss
 Rhizomnium magnifolium – large-leaf thyme-moss
 Rhizomnium pseudopunctatum – felted thyme-moss
 Rhizomnium punctatum – dotted thyme-moss
 Rhodobryum roseum – rose-moss
 Rhynchostegiella curviseta – curve-stalked feather-moss
 Rhynchostegiella litorea – scabrous feather-moss
 Rhynchostegiella pumila – dwarf feather-moss
 Rhynchostegiella tenella – tender feather-moss
 Rhynchostegiella teneriffae – Teesdale feather-moss
 Rhynchostegium confertum – clustered feather-moss
 Rhynchostegium megapolitanum – megapolitan feather-moss
 Rhynchostegium murale – wall feather-moss
 Rhynchostegium rotundifolium – round-leaved feather-moss
 Rhytidiadelphus loreus – little shaggy-moss
 Rhytidiadelphus squarrosus – springy turf-moss
 Rhytidiadelphus subpinnatus – scarce turf-moss
 Rhytidiadelphus triquetrus – big shaggy-moss
 Rhytidium rugosum – wrinkle-leaved feather-moss
 Saelania glaucescens – blue dew-moss
 Sanionia orthothecioides – St Kilda hook-moss
 Sanionia uncinata – sickle-leaved hook-moss
 Schistidium agassizii – water Grimmia
 Schistidium atrofuscum – black mountain Grimmia
 Schistidium confertum – compact Grimmia
 Schistidium crassipilum – thickpoint Grimmia
 Schistidium dupretii – Dupret's Grimmia
 Schistidium elegantulum – elegant Grimmia
 Schistidium flaccidum – goblet Grimmia
 Schistidium frigidum – frigid Grimmia
 Schistidium maritimum – seaside Grimmia
 Schistidium papillosum – rough Grimmia
 Schistidium platyphyllum – broadleaf Grimmia
 Schistidium pruinosum – mealy Grimmia
 Schistidium rivulare – river Grimmia
 Schistidium robustum – robust Grimmia
 Schistidium strictum – upright brown Grimmia
 Schistidium trichodon – stook Grimmia
 Schistostega pennata – luminous moss
 Scleropodium cespitans – tufted feather-moss
 Scleropodium tourettii – glass-wort feather-moss
 Scopelophila cataractae – tongue-leaf copper-moss
 Scorpidium cossonii – intermediate hook-moss
 Scorpidium revolvens – rusty hook-moss
 Scorpidium scorpioides – hooked scorpion-moss
 Scorpiurium circinatum – curving feather-moss
 Seligeria acutifolia – sharp rock-bristle
 Seligeria brevifolia – short rock-bristle
 Seligeria calcarea – chalk rock-bristle
 Seligeria calycina – English rock-bristle
 Seligeria campylopoda – bentfoot rock-bristle
 Seligeria carniolica – water rock-bristle
 Seligeria diversifolia – long rock-bristle
 Seligeria donniana – Donn's rock-bristle
 Seligeria oelandica – Irish rock-bristle
 Seligeria pusilla – dwarf rock-bristle
 Seligeria recurvata – recurved rock-bristle
 Sematophyllum demissum – prostrate signal-moss
 Sematophyllum micans – sparkling signal-moss
 Sematophyllum substrumulosum – bark signal-moss
 Sphagnum affine – imbricate bog-moss
 Sphagnum angustifolium – fine bog-moss
 Sphagnum austinii – Austin's bog-moss
 Sphagnum balticum – Baltic bog-moss
 Sphagnum capillifolium – red bog-moss
 Sphagnum compactum – compact bog-moss
 Sphagnum contortum – twisted bog-moss
 Sphagnum cuspidatum – feathery bog-moss
 Sphagnum denticulatum – cow-horn bog-moss
 Sphagnum fallax – flat-topped bog-moss
 Sphagnum fimbriatum – fringed bog-moss
 Sphagnum flexuosum – flexuous bog-moss
 Sphagnum fuscum – rusty bog-moss
 Sphagnum girgensohnii – Girgensohn's bog-moss
 Sphagnum inundatum – lesser cow-horn bog-moss
 Sphagnum lindbergii – Lindberg's bog-moss
 Sphagnum magellanicum – Magellanic bog-moss
 Sphagnum majus – olive bog-moss
 Sphagnum molle – blushing bog-moss
 Sphagnum obtusum – obtuse bog-moss
 Sphagnum palustre – blunt-leaved bog-moss
 Sphagnum papillosum – papillose bog-moss
 Sphagnum platyphyllum – flat-leaved bog-moss
 Sphagnum pulchrum – golden bog-moss
 Sphagnum quinquefarium – five-ranked bog-moss
 Sphagnum riparium – cleft bog-moss
 Sphagnum russowii – Russow's bog-moss
 Sphagnum skyense – Skye bog-moss
 Sphagnum squarrosum – spiky bog-moss
 Sphagnum strictum – pale bog-moss
 Sphagnum subnitens – lustrous bog-moss
 Sphagnum subsecundum – slender cow-horn bog-moss
 Sphagnum tenellum – soft bog-moss
 Sphagnum teres – rigid bog-moss
 Sphagnum warnstorfii – Warnstorf's bog-moss
 Splachnum ampullaceum – cruet collar-moss
 Splachnum sphaericum – round-fruited collar-moss
 Splachnum vasculosum – rugged collar-moss
 Stegonia latifolia – hood-leaved screw-moss
 Straminergon stramineum – straw spear-moss
 Syntrichia amplexa – clay screw-moss
 Syntrichia intermedia – intermediate screw-moss
 Syntrichia laevipila – small hairy screw-moss
 Syntrichia latifolia – water screw-moss
 Syntrichia norvegica – Norway screw-moss
 Syntrichia papillosa – marble screw-moss
 Syntrichia princeps – brown screw-moss
 Syntrichia ruralis – great hairy screw-moss
 Syntrichia virescens – lesser screw-moss
 Taxiphyllum wissgrillii – depressed feather-moss
 Tayloria lingulata – tongue-leaved gland-moss
 Tayloria tenuis – slender gland-moss
 Tetraphis pellucida – pellucid four-tooth moss
 Tetraplodon angustatus – narrow cruet-moss
 Tetraplodon mnioides – slender cruet-moss
 Tetrodontium brownianum – brown's four-tooth moss
 Tetrodontium repandum – small four-tooth moss
 Thamnobryum alopecurum – fox-tail feather-moss
 Thamnobryum angustifolium – Derbyshire feather-moss
 Thamnobryum cataractarum – Yorkshire feather-moss
 Thuidium assimile – Philibert's tamarisk-moss
 Thuidium delicatulum – delicate tamarisk-moss
 Thuidium recognitum – lesser tamarisk-moss
 Thuidium tamariscinum – common tamarisk-moss
 Timmia austriaca – sheathed Timmia
 Timmia norvegica – Norway Timmia
 Tomentypnum nitens – woolly feather-moss
 Tortella densa – clint crisp-moss
 Tortella flavovirens – yellow crisp-moss
 Tortella fragilis – brittle crisp-moss
 Tortella inclinata – bent crisp-moss
 Tortella inflexa – Sassari crisp-moss
 Tortella limosella – Arisaig crisp-moss
 Tortella nitida – neat crisp-moss
 Tortella tortuosa – frizzled crisp-moss
 Tortula atrovirens – rib-leaf moss
 Tortula canescens – dog screw-moss
 Tortula cernua – flamingo-moss
 Tortula cuneifolia – wedge-leaved screw-moss
 Tortula freibergii – Freiberg's screw-moss
 Tortula lanceola – lance-leaved Pottia
 Tortula leucostoma – alpine Pottia
 Tortula marginata – bordered screw-moss
 Tortula modica – blunt-fruited Pottia
 Tortula muralis – wall screw-moss
 Tortula solmsii – solms' screw-moss
 Tortula subulata – awl-leaved screw-moss
 Tortula truncata – common Pottia
 Tortula vahliana – chalk screw-moss
 Tortula viridifolia – bristly Pottia
 Tortula wilsonii – Wilson's Pottia
 Trematodon ambiguus – ambiguous long-necked moss
 Trichodon cylindricus – cylindric ditrichum
 Trichostomum brachydontium – variable crisp-moss
 Trichostomum crispulum – curly crisp-moss
 Trichostomum hibernicum – Irish crisp-moss
 Trichostomum tenuirostre – narrow-fruited crisp-moss
 Ulota bruchii – Bruch's pincushion
 Ulota calvescens – balding pincushion
 Ulota coarctata – club pincushion
 Ulota crispa – crisped pincushion
 Ulota drummondii – Drummond's pincushion
 Ulota hutchinsiae – Hutchins' pincushion
 Ulota phyllantha – frizzled pincushion
 Warnstorfia exannulata – ringless hook-moss
 Warnstorfia fluitans – floating hook-moss
 Warnstorfia sarmentosa – twiggy spear-moss
 Weissia brachycarpa – small-mouthed beardless-moss
 Weissia condensa – curly beardless-moss
 Weissia controversa – green-tufted stubble-moss
 Weissia levieri – levier's beardless-moss
 Weissia longifolia – crisp beardless-moss
 Weissia multicapsularis – many-fruited beardless-moss
 Weissia perssonii – Persson's stubble-moss
 Weissia rostellata – beaked beardless-moss
 Weissia rutilans – pointed-leaved stubble-moss
 Weissia squarrosa – spreading-leaved beardless-moss
 Weissia sterilis – sterile beardless-moss
 Weissia x mittenii – Mitten's beardless-moss
 Zygodon conoideus – lesser yoke-moss
 Zygodon forsteri – knothole yoke-moss
 Zygodon gracilis – slender yoke-moss
 Zygodon rupestris – park yoke-moss
 Zygodon stirtonii – Stirton's yoke-moss
 Zygodon viridissimus – green yoke-moss

External links
British Bryological Society Checklist of British and Irish Bryophytes -searchable online database, listing 881 taxa of mosses (i.e. species, subspecies and varieties)

British Isles, List of
Moss
Mosses
Mosses